In the 1816 elections in Pennsylvania, David Scott (DR) won one of the two seats in the , but resigned before the 15th Congress began, having been appointed judge of the court of common pleas.  A special election was held on October 14, 1817 to fill the resulting vacancy.

Election results

Murray took his seat on December 1, 1817, at the start of the 1st session of the 15th Congress

See also
List of special elections to the United States House of Representatives

References

Pennsylvania 1817 10
Pennsylvania 1817 10
1817 10
Pennsylvania 10
United States House of Representatives 10
United States House of Representatives 1817 10